Thirty Years of Maximum R&B is a box set by British rock band, The Who released by Polydor Records internationally and by MCA Records in the U.S.; since 2003, it has been issued in America by Geffen Records. The set consists of four CDs that span The Who's career from their early days when they were known as The High Numbers 1964 to their 1991 cover of Elton John's "Saturday Night's Alright for Fighting". It contains well-known tracks from studio albums, rarities, interviews, commercials, and sketches. A video titled Thirty Years of Maximum R&B Live was also released in 1994.

Track listing
All songs written by Pete Townshend except where noted. Any tracks with ** are commercials or dialogues recorded for BBC radio. Background music on 'Poetry Cornered' is 'Laguna Sunrise' taken from Black Sabbath's 1972 album, Black Sabbath Vol. 4.

Disc one

Disc two

Disc three

Disc four

Sales certifications

Personnel
The Who
Roger Daltrey - vocals, harmonica, percussion, guitar
Kenney Jones - drums on "The Real Me", "You Better You Bet", "Eminence Front", and "Twist and Shout"
John Entwistle - bass guitar, horns, piano, vocals
Keith Moon - drums and percussion (all except noted), vocals on "Bell Boy" and "Girl's Eyes"
Pete Townshend - guitars, synthesizer, piano, organ, vocals

Additional musicians
Jon Astley - drums on "Saturday Night's Alright (For Fighting)"
Steve "Boltz" Bolton - guitar on "I'm a Man"
John "Rabbit" Bundrick - keyboards on "The Real Me" and "I'm a Man"
Jody Linscott - percussion on "I'm a Man"
Jimmy Page - guitar on "I Can't Explain"
Simon Phillips - drums on "I'm a Man"

Design
 Design & Art Direction by Richard Evans

References

External links
1988 intended box set tapes
Thirty Years of Maximum R&B liner notes – Song-by-song liner notes for the album

Albums produced by Bill Szymczyk
Albums produced by Glyn Johns
Albums produced by Jon Astley
Albums produced by Kit Lambert
Albums produced by Shel Talmy
The Who compilation albums
1994 compilation albums
Geffen Records compilation albums
MCA Records compilation albums
Polydor Records compilation albums